The NorthPort Batang Pier first participated in the Philippine Basketball Association (PBA) Draft on August 19, 2012, one month before their first PBA season. The Batang Pier bought the original franchise of the Powerade Tigers in June 2012. NorthPort, then named as GlobalPort, received the rights for all of the Powerade's players and draftees.

Vic Manuel became the team's first draft choice, the 9th pick in the 2012 PBA Draft (draft pick was acquired via trade with the B-Meg Llamados).

Selections

Notes
1.All players entering the draft are Filipinos until proven otherwise.

References

Philippine Basketball Association draft